Bornwell Mwape (born 30 September 1991) is a Zambian professional footballer who currently plays as a forward for AmaZulu F.C.

External links 
 

1991 births
Living people
Zambian footballers
AmaZulu F.C. players
Association football forwards
Zambia international footballers